S. canus may refer to:
 Scytalopus canus, a bird species
 Spermophilus canus, a rodent species